A list of rosters for active teams in the Indoor Football League.

Arizona Rattlers

Bay Area Panthers

Duke City Gladiators

Frisco Fighters

Green Bay Blizzard

Iowa Barnstormers

Massachusetts Pirates

Northern Arizona Wranglers

Quad City Steamwheelers

San Diego Strike Force

Sioux Falls Storm

Tucson Sugar Skulls

Tulsa Oilers

Vegas Knight Hawks

 List
Indoor Football League